The Feldman Ecopark in  Lisne, Kharkiv Raion is a regional landscape park, which combined animal care and  therapy for children with special needs before the 2022 Russian invasion of Ukraine. It is a project of  the ICF "Oleksandr Feldman Foundation". The park was originally created in Derhachi Raion, the Raion was later merged into the Kharkiv Raion.

Russian invasion
Feldman Ecopark was largely destroyed during the Russo-Ukrainian war of 2022. During shelling three workers died. Two workers arrived later at the park to feed the animals. Their bodies have been found.
The Russians stole vegetables intended for animal feed.
Two orangutans and one chimpanzee have been killed.
A couple of bisons have been killed by shelling, a ten-month-old one left without parents.
About 6000 animals were evacuated from the park. A sixth volunteer was killed during evacuation of African buffaloes.

References

External links
Portal

Kharkiv Raion
Natural heritage sites in Ukraine